Greg Miller (born 1 April 1976 in Glasgow) is a Scottish former professional footballer who played as a midfielder and is currently manager of Portsmouth U18.

Career
Miller began his career with Hutchison Vale before turning professional in 1995 with Hibernian. Over the next two seasons, Miller made 15 appearances in the Scottish Football League, scoring one goal. Miller's next team was Livingston, where he made just five League appearances. Miller moved to Motherwell in 1998, making a further 4 League appearances. After just one season, Miller signed for Clydebank, making scoring 2 goals in 35 League appearances over the next year. Miller's next club was Brechin City, where he spent four years, making 89 League appearances. Miller moved to Arbroath in 2004, making 50 League appearances over the next two seasons. 

He retired from professional football in 2006 to become a coach at first club Hibernian.  Since leaving Hibs in 2006, he has held coaching roles in Scotland, England and Japan.  Portsmouth U18 appointed him as manager in 2021.

Personal life
His father Alex and brother Graeme have also been professional footballers.

References

External links 

 

1976 births
Living people
Scottish footballers
Hibernian F.C. players
Livingston F.C. players
Motherwell F.C. players
Clydebank F.C. (1965) players
Brechin City F.C. players
Arbroath F.C. players
Scottish Football League players
Scottish Premier League players
Hibernian F.C. non-playing staff
Scotland national football team non-playing staff
Barnsley F.C. non-playing staff
Portsmouth F.C. non-playing staff
Footballers from Glasgow
Association football midfielders